One Day as a Lion is the debut EP by One Day as a Lion, the musical duo consisting of Rage Against the Machine frontman Zack de la Rocha on vocals/keyboard and Jon Theodore, formerly of The Mars Volta, on drums. The mixing for the album was done by Mario C.

On July 16 the track "Wild International" was made available to stream on the band's MySpace page. It was also premiered by L.A. radio station KROQ as well as Australian radio station Triple J. The EP was released on July 18, 2008 in Australia and July 22, 2008 in the US. It was also released on iTunes in iTunes Plus format and on Amazon.com's MP3 Download service.

Commercial performance
One Day as a Lion's eponymous EP placed at number 28 on the US Billboard 200, selling 17,000 copies in its first week.

Track listing
 "Wild International" – 3:47
 "Ocean View" – 4:07
 "Last Letter" – 3:58
 "If You Fear Dying" – 3:57
 "One Day as a Lion" – 4:25

Personnel 
 Zack de la Rocha – vocals, keyboards
 Jon Theodore – drums

Charts

References

External links
One Day as a Lion official website

2008 debut EPs
One Day as a Lion albums